Hugh Warner McCullough (May 18, 1916February 11, 1999) was an American football player who played five seasons in the National Football League (NFL). During his time in the NFL, McCullough played for the Pittsburgh Pirates (later renamed the Pittsburgh Steelers in 1940), Chicago Cardinals, Philadelphia-Pittsburgh Steagles and the Boston Yanks.

McCullough was drafted from the University of Oklahoma by Pittsburgh in the 4th round of the 1939 NFL draft, as selection #26.

References

1916 births
1999 deaths
American football halfbacks
American football quarterbacks
Boston Yanks players
Chicago Cardinals players
Great Lakes Navy Bluejackets football players
Oklahoma Sooners football players
Pittsburgh Pirates (football) players
Steagles players and personnel
Players of American football from Oklahoma
Philadelphia Eagles players